Bogdanovka is a rural locality (a village) in Urman-Bishkadaksky Selsoviet, Ishimbaysky District, Bashkortostan, Russia. The population was 6 as of 2010. There is 1 street.

Geography 
Bogdanovka is located 9 km northeast of Ishimbay (the district's administrative centre) by road. Novogeorgiyevka is the nearest rural locality.

References 

Rural localities in Ishimbaysky District